Troitskoye is a rural locality (a selo) and the administrative center of Troitskoye Rural Settlement, Liskinsky District, Voronezh Oblast, Russia. The population was 1,203 as of 2010. There are 11 streets.

Geography 
Troitskoye is located 36 km northwest of Liski (the district's administrative centre) by road. Bodeyevka is the nearest rural locality.

References 

Rural localities in Liskinsky District